Weissella fabaria  is a bacterium from the genus of Weissella which has been isolated from fermented cocoa beans from New Tafo in Ghana.

References

 

Bacteria described in 2010
Weissella